Gonzalo Damian Marronkle (born 14 November 1984 in Córdoba, Argentina) is an Argentine former footballer. He started his career with Lanús before to moving on to other clubs such as Los Andes and Defensa. In 2004, he moved to Portugal to FC Porto but didn't make an impact and played for lower Portuguese clubs like Marco and Chaves before moving to Portimonense where he was the main striker and goal threat.

Honours

Clubs

Hà Nội F.C.
V.League 1
 Winners : 2010, 2013, 2016
Vietnamese Super Cup
 Winners : 2010
Vietnamese National Cup
AFC Cup    :
Quarter-finals 2014 AFC Cup

Individuals
Top goalscorer V.League 1: 2013

References

External links
 Primera División statistics

1984 births
Living people
Sportspeople from Córdoba Province, Argentina
Argentine footballers
Club Atlético Lanús footballers
Expatriate footballers in Portugal
Defensa y Justicia footballers
F.C. Marco players
Portimonense S.C. players
G.D. Chaves players
FC Porto players
FC Porto B players
Hanoi FC players
V.League 1 players
Argentine Primera División players
Primera Nacional players
Argentine expatriate footballers
Expatriate footballers in Vietnam
Argentine expatriate sportspeople in Portugal
Argentine expatriate sportspeople in Vietnam
Association football forwards